Vasilije Micić (born 13 January 1994) is a Serbian professional basketball player for Anadolu Efes of the Turkish Basketball Super League and the EuroLeague. He also represents the Serbian national basketball team internationally. He was selected by the Philadelphia 76ers with the 52nd overall pick in the 2014 NBA draft.

A three-time All-EuroLeague selection, Micić led Anadolu Efes to two EuroLeague titles, for 2021 and 2022, winning the EuroLeague MVP in 2021 as well as the both Final Four MVPs.

Junior career
From 2002 to 2006, Micić played for the OKK Beograd youth system. In 2006–07, he played for Crvena zvezda juniors, and then from 2007 to 2010, he played for FMP Železnik juniors.

Professional career

Mega Vizura (2010–2014)
In 2010, Micić signed with Mega Vizura. At the age of 16, he made his Basketball League of Serbia debut, going on to play 35 games in 2010–11. In his first season with the club, he appeared in 35 games of the Serbian League and averaged 8.5 points, 3.1 rebounds, and 2.8 assists per game. On 22 November 2011, just 8 games into the 2011–12 season, Micić suffered a season-ending knee injury. Over 8 games, he averaged 15.9 points, 5 assists and 3.5 rebounds per game.

In the 2012–13 season, he became a leader with Boban Marjanović of the team which was promoted to the Adriatic League for the first time in the club's history at the end of the season. Over 41 games in the Serbian League, he averaged 11.8 points and 5 assists per game.

On 6 June 2013, Micić signed a two-year contract extension with Mega Vizura. On 8 April 2014, he broke his hand which sidelined him off the court for one month. In his first ABA League season, he averaged 12.1 points, 3.2 rebounds and 5.8 assists over 25 games.

Bayern Munich and loan to Crvena Zvezda (2014–2016)
On 4 August 2014, Micić signed a two-year deal with an option for one more season with the German team Bayern Munich. On 28 November 2014, in a EuroLeague game against Panathinaikos, he partially ruptured collateral ligament in his right elbow and was expected to miss six weeks of play. He appeared in 32 games of the German League averaging 7 points and 3.3 assists per game. He also made a debut in the 2014–15 Euroleague, but appeared in only 6 games and averaging 7.5 points per game.

With the start of 2015–16 season, his playing time furtherly decreased in Bayern. In mid-season, on 27 December 2015, Micić was loaned to Crvena zvezda for the rest of the 2015–16 season. He appeared in 17 games of the 2015–16 Euroleague for Crvena zvezda, averaging 5.5 points and 3.6 assists per game. With loan being ended, Micić was released by Bayern on 25 July 2016.

Tofaş (2016–2017)
On 26 July 2016, Micić signed with Turkish BSL club Tofaş for the 2016–17 Basketbol Süper Ligi season. In 24 games with Tofaş, Micić averaged 13.2 points, 3.9 assists and 2.7 rebounds while shooting 46% from the field.

Žalgiris Kaunas (2017–2018)

On 15 June 2017, Micić signed a two-year contract with the Lithuanian club Žalgiris Kaunas. Žalgiris Kaunas had a historic season in which it won yet another Lithuanian League championship and qualified to EuroLeague Final Four tournament. In 2018 EuroLeague Final Four, it lost to the Fenerbahçe Basketball in the semifinal and won in the third-place game against the CSKA Moscow. Over 36 in 2017–18 EuroLeague season, Micić averaged 7.7 points, 4.2 assists, and 2.2 rebounds per game. After the season, Micić along with his teammate Kevin Pangos parted ways with the team.

Anadolu Efes (2018–present)
On 20 June 2018, Micić signed a two-year contract with Turkish club Anadolu Efes. In 2018–19 season, Micić led his team to the 2019 EuroLeague Final Four, where they lost in the final game to the CSKA Moscow. Over 37 games in 2018–19 EuroLeague season, he averaged career-highs of 12.1 points, 5.5 assists, and 2.2 rebounds per game.

On 25 May 2019, Micić signed two-year contract extension with Anadolu Efes. On 10 August 2020, his agent confirmed that he was returning to the team for the 2020-21 season, rather than try for the NBA.

By the end of his 2020–21 EuroLeague campaign, Micić became just the fourth EuroLeague player of all-time to score at least 100 two-pointers, 70 threes, and 100 free throws in a single season. He also became the first player ever to have made more than 132 two-pointers while making at least 70 triples and 100 free throws. For his major performances all season long, Micić was named to the All-EuroLeague First Team, and received the EuroLeague MVP award. As well, Micić and his fellow Serbian countryman Nikola Jokić became the first-ever pair of players from the same country to be awarded both NBA MVP and EuroLeague MVP honors in the same season. On 30 May 2021, he led his team to their first Euroleague Championship and was named the EuroLeague Final Four MVP. Over 40 EuroLeague games, he averaged then-career-high 16.7 points per game.

Over 34 games of the 2021–22 EuroLeague season, Micić averaged season-leading and career-high 18.2 points (for which he received the Alphonso Ford EuroLeague Top Scorer Trophy), 4.6 assists and 2.7 rebounds per game. Micić won back-to-back EuroLeague title with Anadolu Efes, after scoring the winning three-pointer in the 2022 EuroLeague Final Four semifinal game against Olympiacos, and later scoring 23 points in the final game against Real Madrid. For his performances, he was once again named the EuroLeague Final Four MVP.

NBA draft rights
In June 2014, alongside his teammates Nemanja Dangubić and Nikola Jokić, Micić attended the Eurocamp, a basketball camp based in Treviso for the NBA draft prospects. He impressed scouts, putting 14 points and 10 assists in 25 minutes of the game. In March 2014, Micić confirmed that he would enter the 2014 NBA draft. On 26 June 2014, Micić was selected by the Philadelphia 76ers with the 52nd overall pick in the 2014 NBA draft. On 8 December 2020, Micić's draft rights were acquired by the Oklahoma City Thunder as part of the trade that sent Danny Green to the 76ers.

National team career

In 2011, Micić won a silver medal with the Serbian U18 team at the 2011 FIBA Europe Under-18 Championship. In 2013, he again won a silver medal with the Serbian U19 team at the 2013 FIBA Under-19 World Cup, where he was to the All-Tournament Team. In the same year, he debuted for the senior Serbian national team at the EuroBasket 2013 in Slovenia, where he averaged 4.4 points, 1.5 rebounds and 1.3 assists per game.

Micić also represented Serbia at the EuroBasket 2017, where they won the silver medal, after losing in the final game to Slovenia.

At the 2019 FIBA Basketball World Cup, the national team of Serbia was dubbed as favorite to win the trophy, but was eventually upset in the quarterfinals by Argentina. With wins over the United States and Czech Republic, it finished in fifth place. Micić averaged 5.6 points, 1.8 rebounds and 3.3 assists over 8 games.

Personal life
Vasilije's sister, Nina, is a professional snowboarder.

Career statistics

EuroLeague

|-
| style="text-align:left;"|2014–15
| style="text-align:left;" rowspan=2|Bayern
| 6 || 1 || 18.0 || .450 || .200 || .875 || 1.5 || 3.2 || .5 || .0 || 7.5 || 6.8
|-
| style="text-align:left;" rowspan=2| 2015–16
| 4 || 0 || 6.2 || .000 || .000 || 1.000 || .8 || .8 || .5 || .3 || .5 || -1.0
|-
| style="text-align:left;"|Crvena zvezda
| 17 || 1 || 17.4 || .341 || .361 || .724 || 1.8 || 3.6 || .2 || .2 || 5.5 || 5.0
|-
| style="text-align:left;"|2017–18
| style="text-align:left;"|Žalgiris
|style="background:#CFECEC;"| 36* || 10 || 22.4 || .432 || .355 || .707 || 2.2 || 4.2 || .9 || .0 || 7.7 || 8.6
|-
| style="text-align:left;"|2018–19
| style="text-align:left;"rowspan="4"|Anadolu Efes
|style="background:#CFECEC;"| 37* || 30 || 28.2 || .474 || .371 || .819 || 2.2 || 5.5 || 1.0 || .1 || 12.4 || 13.9
|-
| style="text-align:left;"|2019–20
| 24 || 22 || 30.6 || .467 || .397 || .964 || 2.5 || 5.8 || 1.3 || .0 || 14.5 || 16.0
|-
| style="text-align:left;background:#AFE6BA;"|2020–21†
| 40 || 34 || 29.6 || .489 || .389 || .865 || 2.6 || 4.9 || 1.2 || .0 || 16.7 || 17.5
|-
| style="text-align:left;background:#AFE6BA;"|2021–22†
| 34 || 26 || 30.2 || .461 || .339 || .854 || 2.7 || 4.6 || 1.1 || .0 ||style="background:#CFECEC;"| 18.2* || 17.5
|- class="sortbottom"
| style="text-align:center;" colspan=2| Career
| 198 || 126 || 26.3 || .460 || .365 || .837 || 2.3 || 4.7 || 1.0 || .1 || 12.7 || 13.3

See also 
 List of NBA drafted players from Serbia
 Philadelphia 76ers draft history

References

External links

 Vasilije Micić at aba-liga.com
 Vasilije Micić at beko-bbl.de
 Vasilije Micić at euroleague.net
 Vasilije Micić at fiba.com
 Vasilije Micić at tblstat.net

1994 births
Living people
2019 FIBA Basketball World Cup players
ABA League players
Anadolu Efes S.K. players
Basketball League of Serbia players
BC Žalgiris players
FC Bayern Munich basketball players
KK Crvena zvezda players
KK Mega Basket players
Philadelphia 76ers draft picks
Point guards
Serbia men's national basketball team players
Serbian expatriate basketball people in Germany
Serbian expatriate basketball people in Lithuania
Serbian expatriate basketball people in Turkey
Serbian men's basketball players
Sportspeople from Kraljevo
Tofaş S.K. players